Tomos Williams (born 1 January 1995) is a Welsh rugby union player who plays for Cardiff Rugby as a scrum half. He is a Wales international, and played for the Wales sevens team during the 2013–14 IRB Sevens World Series.

Club career
Cardiff academy graduate, Tomos Williams, made his senior debut as a replacement against Munster in 2013. Williams would make several more appearances as a replacement before his first Cardiff start in a 23-13 win over Ulster. Williams breakthrough season came in 2016/17, making 30 appearances over the campaign. This include a first Cardiff try against Edinburgh on the opening day of the season, and a first brace in an away defeat to Leinster.

Williams scored a crucial try for Cardiff in the Challenge Cup final victory over Gloucester, which was voted the Try of the Season for the 2017/18 campaign.

International career
Williams won Welsh caps at U18 level from Coleg y Cymoedd and then made 18 appearances at U20 level over two seasons. He made his Wales Sevens debut as a 19-year-old in the Japan leg of the 2013–14 IRB Sevens World Series and went on to play in tournaments on the Gold Coast, in South Africa, and Dubai.

In May 2017 Williams was named in the Wales senior squad for the first time for the tests against Tonga and Samoa. He sat on the bench for the game against Samoa in Apia, but his international bow didn’t come until a year later. That was on the summer tour to the USA and Argentina when he scored a vital try in the 22-20 win over South Africa at the RFK Stadium in Washington DC.

He was again on the score sheet when he was selected for his next start in the 2018 autumn triumph over Tonga and he claimed another try on his Six Nations debut as Wales battled back to beat France in Paris on 1 February 2019.

In September 2019, Williams was selected as part of the Wales squad for the 2019 World Cup. Williams replaced Gareth Davies in the first pool game against Georgia and scored his first World Cup try within 20 minutes of his introduction. Williams appeared in every Wales game from the bench, scoring a further try in the final pool game against Uruguay.

International tries

References

External links

Cardiff Rugby Player Profile

1995 births
Living people
Cardiff Rugby players
People educated at Treorchy Comprehensive School
Rugby union players from Treorchy
Wales international rugby union players
Welsh rugby union players
Rugby union scrum-halves